was a Japanese actor. His wife was actress Yumi Takano. His first starring role in the film was in Momoiro no Yuwaku in 1931. In 1947, he formed the Mingei Theatre Company. Shimizu often work with Akira Kurosawa. He appeared in more than 250 films between 1931 and 1976.

Selected filmography

 The 47 Ronin (1941)
 No Regrets for Our Youth (1946) as Professor Hakozaki
 A Ball at the Anjo House (1947)
 One Wonderful Sunday (1947) as the Dance Hall Manager
 Drunken Angel (1948) as Boss
 Stray Dog (1949)
 Bōryoku no Machi (1950)
 Scandal (1950) as Judge
 Story of a Beloved Wife (1951)
 The Life of Oharu (1952)
 Children of Hiroshima (1952)
 The Life of Oharu (1952) as kikuoji
 Ikiru (1952) as Doctor
 Epitome (1953)
 Gate of Hell (1953)
 Sansho the Bailiff (1954) as Masauji Taira
 I Live in Fear (1955) as Yamazaki, Yoshi's husband
 Season of the Sun (1956)
 Rusty Knife (1958) as Shingo Mano
 The Loyal 47 Ronin (1958)
 Sanjuro (1962) as Kikui
 High and Low (1963) as prison director
 Kojiki taishō (1964) as Tokugawa Ieyasu
 Red Handkerchief (1964)
 Shiroi Kyotō (1966) as Masanori Kōno
 The Snow Woman (1968)
 The Sands of Kurobe (1968) as Tayama
 Savage Wolf Pack (1969) as Yamamuro
 Samurai Banners (1969) as Yokota Takatoshi
 Battle of the Japan Sea (1969)
 The Wild Sea (1969)
 Fuji sanchō (1970)
 The Militarists (1970), Saburō Kurusu
 Tora-san's Dream-Come-True (1972) as Yunaka
 Oreno Eranda Onna (1976) as Washio

Television
 Ako Roshi (1964) as Sengoku Hokinokami
 Minamoto no Yoshitsune (1966) as Fujiwara no Motonari
 Haru no Sakamichi (1972) as Asano Nagamasa
 Karei-naru Ichizoku (1975) as Miyamoto

References

External links

1908 births
1975 deaths
Japanese male film actors
Male actors from Tokyo
20th-century Japanese male actors